is a Japanese former Nippon Professional Baseball infielder.

References 

1972 births
Living people
Baseball people from Hyōgo Prefecture 
Japanese baseball players
Nippon Professional Baseball infielders
Yokohama BayStars players
Japanese baseball coaches
Nippon Professional Baseball coaches